William Reginald Rawlings, MM (September 1890 – 9 August 1918) was a decorated Australian Aboriginal soldier of the First World War. He was also the uncle of Captain Reginald Saunders, the first Aboriginal commissioned officer in the Australian Military Forces.

Early life
Rawlings was born in Purnim, Victoria, in September 1890 to William and Bessie Rawlings. He grew up on the Aboriginal reserve at Framlingham, and was a horse-breaker around Purnim before enlisting in the Australian Imperial Force at Warrnambool, Victoria on 20 March 1916.

First World War
After undertaking initial training, Rawlings embarked on HMAT Orsova from Melbourne on 1 August 1916. He joined the 29th Battalion, 8th Brigade in France, as part of the battalion's 8th Reinforcements.

Rawlings was awarded the Military Medal for bravery during heavy fighting along the Morlancourt Ridge on 28–29 July 1918. Private Rawlings was killed in action on 9 August 1918, during the capture of Vauvillers, France. Rawlings was 27 years old. His MM was gazetted on 11 December 1918.

Rawlings' friend, Henry Thorpe, who also received the Military Medal, was killed on the same day. They are both buried in the Heath Cemetery, Harbonnieres, France.

Notes

References

External links
 Digital images of NAA: B2455, Rawlings William Reginald, First World War personnel file, National Archives of Australia

1892 births
1918 deaths
Australian military personnel killed in World War I
Australian recipients of the Military Medal
Indigenous Australian military personnel
Australian Army soldiers
Burials at Heath Cemetery, Harbonnieres
Military personnel from Victoria (Australia)